Miroslav Lipták (born 7 October 1968) is a Slovak former cyclist. He competed at the 1992 Summer Olympics for Czechoslovakia and at the 1996 Summer Olympics for Slovakia.

Major results

1986
1st  Overall Course de la Paix Juniors
1988
10th Overall Tour de la Communauté Européenne
1989
1st Stage 8 Okolo Slovenska
1990
1st  Overall Okolo Slovenska
1991
3rd Overall Peace Race
1997
1st  Time trial, National Road Championships
1998
2nd Time trial, National Road Championships
2000
1st Stage 2 Tour de Serbie

References

External links
 

1968 births
Living people
Czech male cyclists
Slovak male cyclists
Olympic cyclists of Czechoslovakia
Olympic cyclists of Slovakia
Cyclists at the 1992 Summer Olympics
Cyclists at the 1996 Summer Olympics
Sportspeople from Trenčín